Clichy-sous-Bois is a commune in the eastern suburbs of Paris, France.

Clichy-sous-Bois is not served by any motorway, major road, or railway and therefore remains one of the most isolated of Paris's inner suburbs. It is one of the most economically disadvantaged suburbs and is where the 2005 civil unrest and riots began, which subsequently spread nationwide.

Geography
The woods are remnants of the Bondy wood (Forêt Départementale de Bondy, Parc de la Fosse Maussoin, Parc de la Mairie).

History
The name of Clichy-sous-Bois comes from Roman Cleppius,  seventh century Clippiacum superius, twelfth century Clichiacum.

Flint tools from the Neolithic have been found here.
Clichy en Aulnois belonged to the lords of Livry in the early Middle Ages.
Subject to the Knights Templar in the 13th century, Clichy subsequently passed into possession of the Knights Hospitaller order. Until the 16th century, it was a hunting resort of the French kings. In the 18th century, it belonged to the Duc d'Orléans. In 1820, the village had about 150 inhabitants.

On 20 May 1869, a part of the territory of Clichy-sous-Bois was detached and merged with a part of the territory of Livry-Gargan and a small part of the territory of Gagny to create the commune of Le Raincy.

In 1870, Clichy was affected by the Franco-Prussian War.

Heraldry

Crime and civil unrest

Clichy-sous-Bois has a high unemployment rate compared to the rest of the country, about 20%, and 40% for the people under 25 years old (source : INSEE). 
The suburban riots of October 2005 originated in Clichy-sous-Bois after the death of two young boys who had been escaping a police control. Then the riots spread to other communes of the department, and then to virtually every major urban area in France.

Demography
The majority of its population is of African heritage.
 the youth unemployment rate was 40%.

Immigration

 33% of the commune's residents were foreign nationals, higher than both the departmental average and the French national average.

Transport
Clichy-sous-Bois is not served directly by any station of the Paris Métro, RER, or suburban rail network. The closest station to Clichy-sous-Bois is Le Raincy – Villemomble – Montfermeil station on Paris RER line E. This station is located in the neighboring commune of Le Raincy,  from the town center of Clichy-sous-Bois. There is also a T4 Tramway stop at Gargan which is 1.1 km from the town centre. The tramway terminates at the Bondy station for RER-E2, which is only 3 stops to Paris Gare du Nord ( via correspondence at Magenta station) The only direct transport in and out of Clichy-sous-bois is by bus (for example the 601AB bus if you are coming from "Le Raincy-Villemonble-Montfermeil" station).

Due to the lack of a rail link, it was claimed the time on public transport to the city centre can be 1.5 hours  but this predates the tramway opened November 2006. A new branch of the T4 Tramway was scheduled to open in 2017, eventually opened in 2019, passes through the heart of Clichy-sous-Bois.

Economy
As of 2007 the unemployment rate was around 20%. It was close to 50% in the housing estates defined by The Economist as "the worst."

Politics
In 2007 the voting turnout for the presidential election in Clichy was 82%. The voter registration had increased by less than 20%.

Education
There are twelve preschool sites, and eleven elementary school sites.

 there are about 2,500 students in Clichy's four secondary schools. The following junior high schools are in the commune:
 Collège Romain-Rolland
 Collège Louise-Michel
 Collège Robert-Doisneau 
 The construction of this junior high relieved Louise-Michel, which saw its student population decline from about 1,200 in 2004 to over 500 in 2012.

The sole senior high school/sixth form college in Clichy is Lycée Alfred-Nobel.  the lycée has 1,100 students. It has an agreement with the Institut d'études politiques de Paris (Sciences-Po) which allows applicants from the school to gain entrance to the university without taking the entrance examination. As of 2007 three students from the lycée had been admitted.

Personalities linked to the commune

 Roberto Alagna, tenor
 Mamadou Samassa, footballer
 Claude Dilain

See also
Communes of the Seine-Saint-Denis department

References

External links

 Official website
 pictures of clichy sous bois :

Communes of Seine-Saint-Denis